The 1955 Middle Tennessee Blue Raiders football team represented the Middle Tennessee State College—now known as Middle Tennessee State University—as a member of the Ohio Valley Conference (OVC) during the 1955 college football season. Led by ninth-year head coach Charles M. Murphy, the Blue Raiders compiled a record an overall record of 7–2–1 with a mark of 4–1 in conference play, placing second in the OVC. The team's captains were G. Haley and S. Corban.

Schedule

References

Middle Tennessee
Middle Tennessee Blue Raiders football seasons
Middle Tennessee Blue Raiders football